Gazi Rakayet is a Bangladeshi actor, director and writer. He is the recipient of various accolades, including 10 Bangladesh National Film Awards (with two for Best Director) for the films Mrittika Maya (2013), Anil Bagchir Ekdin  (2015) and Gor (The Grave) (2020).

Education
Rakayet passed his SSC exam from Gandaria High School in 1983 and HSC exam with an outstanding result from Notre Dame College, Dhaka in 1985. Then he earned his BSc degree in civil engineering from Bangladesh University of Engineering and Technology in 1993.

Career
In 1980, when Rakayet was in grade seven, he performed in a stage-play named Halchal. In 1988, he joined a team of stage actors at the Group Theatre Federation. Later he performed at Bailey Road for the first time in Kiron Mritya's Amrit Bish, directed by Syed Mohidul Islam. His first web series is Unoloukik. He acted as Ishtiaque Mirza, a writer in Chorki's web film Munshigiri.

Personal life
Rakayet was married to actress Afsana Mimi until 1996.

Filmography
 Mrittika Maya (2013)
 Anil Bagchir Ekdin (2015)
Ahoto Phuler Golpo (2018)
Tales of Chandrabati (2019)
 The Grave (2020)
 Munshigiri (2021)
 Gor (The Grave) (2020)
 Mujib: The Making of a Nation (2022)

References

External links
 

Living people
Notre Dame College, Dhaka alumni
Bangladesh University of Engineering and Technology alumni
Bangladeshi film directors
Best Director National Film Award (Bangladesh) winners
Best Screenplay National Film Award (Bangladesh) winners
Best Supporting Actor National Film Award (Bangladesh) winners
Best Dialogue National Film Award (Bangladesh) winners
Best Story National Film Award (Bangladesh) winners
Place of birth missing (living people)
Year of birth missing (living people)